The Little River is a short river in Maine. 

Little River and its main tributary, Grand Lake Brook, provide an alternate drainage from West Grand Lake to Big Lake, in parallel to Grand Lake Stream. Big Lake drains into the Grand Falls Flowage, a reservoir created by the Grand Falls Dam on the St. Croix River in Baileyville.

See also
List of rivers of Maine

References

Maine Streamflow Data from the USGS
Maine Watershed Data From Environmental Protection Agency

Rivers of Washington County, Maine
Rivers of Maine